Universal Studios Hollywood is a film studio and theme park in the San Fernando Valley area of Los Angeles County, California. About 70% of the studio lies within the unincorporated county island known as Universal City while the rest lies within the city limits of Los Angeles, California. It is one of the oldest and most famous Hollywood film studios still in use. Its official marketing headline is "The Entertainment Capital of LA". It was initially created to offer tours of the real Universal Studios sets and is the first of many full-fledged Universal Studios Theme Parks located across the world.

Outside the theme park, a new, all-digital facility near the Universal Pictures backlot was built in an effort to merge all of NBCUniversal's West Coast operations into one area. As a result, the current home for KNBC, KVEA and NBC News with Noticias Telemundo Los Angeles Bureaus with new digital facility is on the Universal lot formerly occupied by Technicolor SA. Universal City includes hotels Universal Hilton & Towers, the Sheraton Universal Hotel, and Universal CityWalk, which offers a collection of shops, restaurants, an 18-screen Universal Cinema and a seven-story IMAX theater. In 2017, the park hosted 9.056 million guests, ranking it 15th in the world and 9th among North American parks.

History

The first studio tour
In 1914, German American immigrant Carl Laemmle bought the Taylor Ranch in the San Fernando Valley and founded Universal City as a gigantic studio with a zoo, its own police and mayor and native Americans living on the premises. On March 14, 1915, Laemmle opened Universal Studios in a two-day grand opening event with 10,000 attendees. He later invited the general public to see all the action for an admission fee of just five cents, which also included a boxed lunch with chicken. There was also a chance to buy fresh produce, since then-rural Universal City was still in part a working farm. This original tour was discontinued around 1930, due to the advent of sound films and the stages being not sufficiently soundproofed.

Backlot fires
Universal Studios Hollywood's backlot has been damaged by fire nine times throughout its history. The first was in 1932, when embers from a nearby brush fire were blown toward the back lot, causing four movie sets to be destroyed and resulting in over $100,000 damage. Seventeen years later, in 1949, another brush fire caused the complete destruction of one building and damage to two others. In 1957, the New York street film studio set was destroyed by an arson fire, causing a half-million dollars in damage. Ten years later, in 1967, twice as much damage was done when the Little Europe area and part of Spartacus Square was destroyed. It also destroyed the European, Denver and Laramie street sets. In 1987, the remaining portion of Spartacus Square was destroyed along with street sets and other buildings. As with the 1957 fire, this was suspected to be the result of an arsonist. Just three years later, another fire was deliberately started in the back lot. The New York Street set, the Ben Hur set and the majority of Courthouse Square were destroyed. In 1997, the seventh fire occurred at the back lot. A portion of Courthouse Square was again destroyed, though most survived.

2008 fire

The most damage was done on June 1, 2008 when a three alarm fire broke out on the back lot of Universal Studios. The fire started when a worker was using a blowtorch to warm asphalt shingles being applied to a facade. The Los Angeles County Fire Department had reported that Brownstone Street, New York Street, New England Street, the King Kong attraction, some structures that make up Courthouse Square, and the Video Vault had burned down (not to be confused with the actual Film Vault; the Video Vault contains duplicates of Universal's film library). Aerial news footage captured the Courthouse building surviving fire for the third time in its history, with only the west side of it being slightly charred. Over 516 firefighters from various local fire departments, as well as two helicopters dropping water, had responded to the fire. Fourteen firefighters and three Los Angeles County sheriffs' deputies sustained minor injuries. The fire was put out after twelve hours, during which time firefighters encountered low water pressure.

Destroyed were 40,000 to 50,000 archived digital video and film copies chronicling Universal's movie and TV show history, dating back to the 1920s, including the films Knocked Up and Atonement, the NBC series Law & Order, The Office, and Miami Vice, and CBS's I Love Lucy.

Universal president Ron Meyer stated "Nothing irreplaceable was lost. We have duplicates of everything that was lost."

Several days after the fire, it was reported that the King Kong attraction would not be rebuilt and would eventually be replaced by a new attraction that had yet to be announced. In August 2008, Universal changed its position and announced plans to rebuild the King Kong attraction, basing the new attraction on the 2005 film adaptation.

It emerged only in June 2019, in an article published by The New York Times that the fire had totally destroyed Building 6197, a warehouse adjoining the King Kong attraction, which housed a video vault and, significantly, a huge archive of analogue audio master tapes belonging to Universal Music Group (UMG). The collection included the master tape catalogues of various labels acquired by Universal over the years, including Chess, Decca, MCA, Geffen, Interscope, A&M, Impulse, and a host of subsidiary labels. Estimates of the individual items lost range from 118,000 to 175,000 album and 45rpm single master tapes, gramophone master discs, lacquers and acetates, as well as all the documentation contained in the tape boxes. Many of the tapes destroyed contained unreleased recordings such as outtakes, alternate versions of released material, and instrumental 'submaster' multitracks created for subsequent dubbing and mixdown to the final master tape. Randy Aronson, who was manager of the vault at the time of the fire, estimates that as many as 500,000 individual song titles were lost.

Among the losses were all of Decca's masters from the 1930s to the 1950s and most of the original Chess masters which included artists such as Chuck Berry, Otis Redding, Muddy Waters and Howlin' Wolf, and most of the John Coltrane's master tapes from his later career on Impulse Records; the Chess, Coltrane and Impulse Records recordings were later confirmed to have survived. In a statement issued on June 11, 2019, UMG disputed The New York Times article saying it contained "numerous inaccuracies", as well as "fundamental misunderstandings of the scope of the incident and affected assets," but was unable to publicly disclose details due to "constraints".

Following the publication of the New York Times story, Questlove of The Roots confirmed that the master tapes for two of the band's albums, including unused material and multi-track recordings, were lost in the fire. Similarly, Nirvana bassist Krist Novoselic said he believed the masters for the band's 1991 album Nevermind were "gone forever" as a result of the fire. Representatives for R.E.M. announced they would investigate the effects the fire may have had on the band's archival materials, while Hole, Steely Dan, Rosanne Cash and Geoff Downes made statements on their possible losses from the fire.

A representative for Eminem confirmed that the rapper's master recordings were digitized months before the fire, but did not confirm whether the physical master reels of his recordings were affected. UMG archivist Patrick Kraus assured that the Impulse Records, John Coltrane, Muddy Waters, Ahmad Jamal, Nashboro Records, and Chess Records masters survived the fire and were still in Universal's archive.

Park history
Shortly after Music Corporation of America (MCA) took over Universal Pictures in 1962, accountants suggested a new tour in the studio commissary would increase profits. On July 15, 1964, the modern tour was established to include a series of dressing room walk-throughs, peeks at actual production, and later, staged events. This grew over the years into a full-blown theme park. The narrated tram tour (formerly "Glamor Trams") still runs through the studio's active backlot, but the staged events, stunt demonstrations and high-tech rides overshadow the motion-picture production that once lured fans to Universal Studios Hollywood.

In 1965, the War Lord Tower opened as one of the first attractions in the theme park. One of the early struggles for Universal was coming up with things for young children to do. The existing small Ma & Pa Kettle Petting Zoo was expanded into the Ark Park. This area encompassed the Mt. Ararat petting zoo with over 200 animals and birds representing 30 species and a Noah's Nursery and a Noah's Love Inn playhouse for children and animals. This was followed by the opening of the Animal Actors' School Stage in 1970. In 1968, the Screen Actors Guild enacted a rule prohibiting visitors from most soundstages. This new rule, coupled with more productions being shot on location, meant the backlot tram tour could not show visitors much in the way of real movie and television production. Jay Stein, President of the Recreation Division, championed the idea of creating exciting experiences for visitors in place of viewing actual production. Later that same year, the Flash Flood set was opened and this first special-effects attraction proved to be a hit. 20,000 gallons of water rushed 200 feet down a narrow Mexican village street, uprooting an old tree and threatening to engulf the tram. The Parting of the Red Sea attraction opened in 1973.  In 1974, the Rockslide staged event was added to the Studio Tour. The following year, The Land of a Thousand Faces opened on the Upper Lot. In 1979, the Battle of Galactica replaced Rockslide as a staged event on the Studio Tour. In 1989's The Wizard, it was the site of the fictional Video Armageddon competition which gave way to the Nintendo World Championships held in 1990.

The Flintstones Show opened, replacing the Star Trek Adventure. In 1991, E.T. Adventure opened as the park's first "dark ride," an industry term for an attraction that uses ride vehicles to take passengers through an indoor show building. Around the same time, sister park Universal Studios Florida opened, which had its own, similar E.T. attraction. The Florida version was more of a conventional theme park and paved the way for the Hollywood park's evolution. In 1993, Back to the Future: The Ride opened, replacing Battle of Galactica. In 1996, Jurassic Park: The Ride opened. In 1997, two shows were replaced: The Land Before Time show replaced Rocky and Bullwinkle Live; and Totally Nickelodeon replaced the Flintstones Show. Just one year after it opened, the Land Before Time show was replaced with Coke Soak. In 1999, T2-3D: Battle Across Time and a Chicken Run Walkthrough opened on the upper lot. Additionally, Beetlejuice's Rock and Roll Graveyard Revue was closed.

In 2000, the Rugrats Magic Adventure replaced Totally Nickelodeon. In 2001, the Nickelodeon Blast Zone opened. Also in 2001, Animal Planet Live replaced the Animal Actors' School Stage. In 2003, Universal Studios Hollywood closed E.T. Adventure to make way for Revenge of the Mummy, which opened in 2004. The following year, Fear Factor Live replaced Spider-Man Rocks. In 2007, Universal's House of Horrors opened, replacing Van Helsing: Fortress Dracula. Both Back to the Future: The Ride and Lucy: A Tribute were closed, being replaced in 2008 by The Simpsons Ride and the Universal Story Museum respectively. Also in 2008, the Nickelodeon Blast Zone was re-branded to the Adventures of Curious George. In 2009, Creature from the Black Lagoon: The Musical replaced Fear Factor Live in the Upper Lot.

In 2010, the Special Effects Stages and Backdraft attractions were closed to make way for Transformers: The Ride 3D, which was announced in 2008 (Special Effects Stages was moved to the former Creature From The Black Lagoon building and reopened as Special Effects Stage). King Kong 360 3-D also opened. On May 24, 2012, Transformers: The Ride 3D opened on the Lower Lot. On December 31, 2012, Universal Studios Hollywood closed T2-3D: Battle Across Time for Despicable Me Minion Mayhem, the attraction at Universal Studios Florida, which opened on April 12, 2014.

In April 2014, the park announced Springfield: a new dining complex to be built around the Simpsons Ride. The new eateries feature "signature eateries from Krusty Burger to Luigi's Pizza and Phineas Q. Butterfat's 5,600 Flavors Ice Cream Parlor to iconic watering holes like Moe's Tavern and Duff's Brewery". It opened on March 28, 2015.

On May 7, 2015, Universal Studios announced it formed a partnership with Nintendo to create attractions and merchandises based on Mario and other Nintendo characters. The following year, the area was called "Super Nintendo World", and was confirmed that it would come to Universal Studios Japan in 2020 as well as Universal Orlando and Universal Studios Hollywood later on.

On August 13, 2017, Shrek 4-D was closed after 14 years to make way for the DreamWorks Theatre attraction.

The International Broadcast Center (IBC) and main press center (MPC) will be located at Universal Studios Hollywood during the 2028 Summer Olympics in Los Angeles.

On September 3, 2018, Jurassic Park: The Ride was closed and refurbished to become Jurassic World: The Ride, which opened on July 12, 2019.

On April 10, 2019, the park announced The Secret Life of Pets: Off the Leash!, an attraction based on The Secret Life of Pets. The attraction was set to open on March 27, 2020, adjacent to the Despicable Me Minion Mayhem attraction. However, Universal announced a temporary closure starting on March 14, 2020 to combat the COVID-19 pandemic. On March 5, 2021, it was announced that Universal Studios Hollywood could reopen with reduced capacity beginning April 1, 2021. At the end of March, it was announced that the park would reopen to California residents on April 16, 2021. Universal also announced that The Secret Life of Pets: Off the Leash! ride would be open to the public on that day, together with a new, fully articulated version of the Indominus Rex on Jurassic World: The Ride.

Areas and attractions

Universal Studios Hollywood is split into two areas on different levels, connected by a series of escalators called the Starway. These areas are known as the Upper lot and Lower lot. As of 2021, Universal Studios Hollywood contains ten rides, seven shows, and two play areas. Each lot features a collection of rides, shows and attractions as well as food, beverage, and merchandise shops.

Upper Lot
The Upper Lot consists of a variety of family-based attractions. The theming of the Upper Lot includes a Mission Revival entrance pathway, known as Universal Boulevard, that features the large Universal Plaza that opened in 2013. There are not as many fully themed lands as there are small environments linked together with a common Art Deco theme that reflects the glamour of Old Hollywood. Universal Boulevard is home to Waterworld: A Live Sea War Spectacular, and the DreamWorks Theatre, the latter which currently serves as the main location for Kung Fu Panda Adventure, a slightly modified version of Kung Fu Panda: Unstoppable Awesomeness from Motiongate Dubai.

The Wizarding World of Harry Potter

The Wizarding World of Harry Potter soft-opened February 12, 2016, and officially opened April 7, 2016, and is the largest themed area in the Upper Lot, featuring the animatronic and screen-based thrill ride Harry Potter and the Forbidden Journey, which is housed in a replica Hogwarts castle, featuring actual props from the films in the queue. In addition, this area includes the family-friendly roller coaster Flight of the Hippogriff, and the interactive Ollivander's Wand Show where a wand picks a witch or a wizard. Two live shows, Frog Choir and Triwizard Spirit Rally, are featured on the outdoor stage. In addition to attractions, the themed area features multiple shops, a Hogwarts Express train picture spot, The Three Broomsticks restaurant, and a variety of outdoor vending carts selling food and drink. Souvenirs and food based on the books and films are sold in the area too.

Lower Lot
The Lower Lot is the smaller of the two lots. There are four rides at this section of the park that each have height restrictions. It features Jurassic World: The Ride, Revenge of the Mummy: The Ride, Mario Kart: Bowser’s Challenge and Transformers: The Ride 3D.

Jurassic World: The Ride, is a water adventure ride that takes visitors through the events of the film Jurassic World, ending with an 84-foot (25.6-meter) drop. Outside the ride stands the Raptor Encounter, a show that happens throughout the day, and the Dino Play jungle gym area for children too small to ride. Revenge of the Mummy: The Ride is a high speed indoor roller coaster transporting guests through moments reminiscent of the 1999 Mummy franchise. Mario Kart: Bowser’s Challenge is an interactive dark ride attraction featuring augmented reality technology based on the Mario Kart franchise, which is located inside of Super Nintendo World. Transformers: The Ride 3D uses high tech technology to simulate a battle between the Autobots and Decepticons with 4K-3D screens and flight simulator ride vehicles. The Lower Lot also features several gift shops and quick service restaurants.

Attendance

Public transportation

Universal Studios Hollywood can easily be accessed by public transportation at Universal City/Studio City. The Metro B line subway train runs between Union Station in Downtown Los Angeles, Westlake, Koreatown, East Hollywood, and Hollywood.

Passengers can also arrive at the entrance of the theme park entrance by several Metro bus routes. Metro Local lines 150, 155, 224, and 240 stop at Lankershim Blvd & Universal Center Drive (front entrance). Metro Local line 165 and Metro Shuttle line 656 Owl stop farther away from the entrance, at Ventura and Lankershim Boulevards. At the front entrance (Universal Center Dr. & Lankershim Blvd), there is a free shuttle tram which takes the passengers directly towards the theme park entrance.

See also

Universal Studios Lot
Universal Classic Monsters

References

External links

 
Universal City, California
San Fernando Valley
Amusement parks opened in 1964
Television studios in the United States
1964 establishments in California
Tourist attractions in Los Angeles County, California
Amusement parks in California
Olympic International Broadcast Centres